Ngabe is a district in the Pool Region of south-eastern Republic of the Congo. The capital lies at Ngabe.

Towns and villages
Mbé was added to the UNESCO World Heritage Tentative List on June 12, 2008 in the Cultural category.

Notable people 

 Ngalifourou, queen and ally of the French colonisers.

References 

Pool Department
Districts of the Republic of the Congo